Margaret Elizabeth Austin  (née Leonard; born 1 April 1933) is a former New Zealand politician. She was an MP from 1984 to 1996, representing first the Labour Party and then briefly United New Zealand.

Life

Early life, family and career
Austin was born in Dunedin on 1 April 1933, and was educated at St Dominic's College, Dunedin, and Sacred Heart College, Christchurch. She studied at Canterbury University College and Christchurch Teachers' College, and graduated with a Bachelor of Science in 1953 and a Diploma of Teaching in 1954. She went on to teach in Christchurch and in 1970 became the head of science at Christchurch Girls' High School and later became senior mistress at Riccarton High School in 1977. She was also a member of the Educational Administration Society and was its president for three years.

In 1955, she married John Austin, and the couple went on to have three children.

Political career

She was first elected to Parliament in the 1984 election as the MP for Yaldhurst, an electorate in western Christchurch.

During her time in Parliament, Austin served as a Minister of Research and Development, Internal Affairs and of Arts, Culture and Heritage at the end of the Fourth Labour Government. In November 1990, when Labour was in opposition, she was appointed as Shadow Minister of Education by Labour leader Mike Moore.

She held the Yaldhurst seat for the Labour Party until 1995 when the seat was abolished, in preparation for the changeover to MMP, and she joined with six other MPs to found the centrist United New Zealand Party. Like all United New Zealand MPs (but Peter Dunne), Austin was not re-elected in the 1996 election; Austin stood in the new  electorate where she came third.

Later activities
She later became Chancellor of Lincoln University from 2000 to 2005. From the late 1990s until about 2011, she worked for the United Nations Educational Scientific and Cultural Organisation (UNESCO). From 2000 to 2007, she was president of the chairs of UNESCO national commissions worldwide. She also has an interest in astronomy, leading the project for the Aoraki-Mackenzie International Dark Sky Reserve.

Honours and awards
Austin was awarded the New Zealand 1990 Commemoration Medal, and in 1993, she was awarded the New Zealand Suffrage Centennial Medal.

In the 1997 Queen's Birthday Honours, Austin was appointed a Member of the New Zealand Order of Merit, for public services. In the 2008 New Year Honours, she was elevated to Companion of the New Zealand Order of Merit, for services to the community.

Austin has been elected as a Companion of the Royal Society of New Zealand.

Further reading

Austin's contribution is: "Speech notes."

{{citation |title = Positioning Polytechnics for the 90s: Association of Polytechnics in New Zealand Annual Conference, October 1991, hosted by Carrington Polytechnic at the Sheraton Hotel, Auckland : edited proceedings [Association of Polytechnics in New Zealand. Annual Conference (1991 : Auckland, N.Z.)] |place = Auckland, [N.Z.] |publisher = Carrington Polytechnic |year = 1991}}Austin's contribution is noted under the title: "Opposition Spokesperson on Education."Austin's contribution is a paper entitled: "[T]he agenda for change and it's [sic] effects on education."This book contains a profile of Austin, with eleven other women.''

Notes

References

|-

|-

1933 births
Companions of the New Zealand Order of Merit
Academic staff of the Lincoln University (New Zealand)
Living people
New Zealand educators
New Zealand Labour Party MPs
Women members of the New Zealand House of Representatives
United New Zealand MPs
Members of the New Zealand House of Representatives
New Zealand MPs for Christchurch electorates
Unsuccessful candidates in the 1996 New Zealand general election
Female interior ministers
Recipients of the New Zealand Suffrage Centennial Medal 1993
Companions of the Royal Society of New Zealand
Chancellors of Lincoln University (New Zealand)
People educated at Trinity Catholic College, Dunedin